The 2006 Monterey Sports Car Championships at Mazda Raceway Laguna Seca was the tenth and final race for the 2006 American Le Mans Series season.  It took place on October 21, 2006.

Official results

Class winners in bold.  Cars failing to complete 70% of winner's distance marked as Not Classified (NC).

Statistics
 Pole Position - #15 Zytek Engineering - 1:13.731
 Fastest Lap - #7 Penske Racing - 1:14.157
 Distance - 
 Average Speed -

External links

  

M
Monterey Sports Car Championships
Monterey Sports Car